The 1982 Eastern 8 Conference Baseball Championship Series was held on May 7 and 8, 1982 to determine the champion of the NCAA Division I Eastern 8 Conference, renamed later in 1982 as the Atlantic 10 Conference, for the 1982 NCAA Division I baseball season.  This was the fourth iteration of the event, and was held on the campus of Rutgers in Piscataway, New Jersey.   won the championship two games to one and earned the conference's automatic bid to the 1982 NCAA Division I baseball tournament.  For the first time, a Most Valuable Player was named, with Jeff Wilson of West Virginia earning the honor.

Format and seeding
The regular season winners of each of the conference's two divisions advanced to a best of three series.

Results
Game One

Game Two

Game Three

References

Championship Series
Atlantic 10 Conference Baseball Tournament
Eastern 8 Conference Baseball Championship Series
Eastern 8 Conference Baseball Championship Series
Baseball in New Jersey
College sports in New Jersey
History of the New York metropolitan area
Piscataway, New Jersey
Sports competitions in New Jersey
Sports in the New York metropolitan area
Tourist attractions in Middlesex County, New Jersey